Beerescourt is a suburb in western Hamilton, New Zealand. It is named after Capt. G. B. Beere, who was granted land in the military settlement at the conclusion of the New Zealand Wars. He set up a fort, and the area became known as Beere's Fort. The name was eventually changed to Beerescourt.

The suburb became a part of Hamilton in 1949 with the 5th boundary extension. The suburb is centred on a low hill, the location of the original fort and lies between State Highway 1 and the Waikato river giving ready access to the central business district and the riverside walkway. The hill and the riverside area give good elevated views. There is a small local shopping centre as well as quick access to shops along Te Rapa Straight.

Demographics

Beerescourt had a population of 2,220 at the 2018 New Zealand census, an increase of 84 people (3.9%) since the 2013 census, and an increase of 186 people (9.1%) since the 2006 census. There were 813 households, comprising 1,068 males and 1,152 females, giving a sex ratio of 0.93 males per female. The median age was 37.6 years (compared with 37.4 years nationally), with 432 people (19.5%) aged under 15 years, 429 (19.3%) aged 15 to 29, 963 (43.4%) aged 30 to 64, and 396 (17.8%) aged 65 or older.

Ethnicities were 79.3% European/Pākehā, 15.9% Māori, 4.5% Pacific peoples, 11.6% Asian, and 1.9% other ethnicities. People may identify with more than one ethnicity.

The percentage of people born overseas was 20.7, compared with 27.1% nationally.

Although some people chose not to answer the census's question about religious affiliation, 45.9% had no religion, 41.5% were Christian, 0.7% had Māori religious beliefs, 2.4% were Hindu, 0.8% were Muslim, 0.7% were Buddhist and 2.3% had other religions.

Of those at least 15 years old, 507 (28.4%) people had a bachelor's or higher degree, and 228 (12.8%) people had no formal qualifications. The median income was $39,300, compared with $31,800 nationally. 432 people (24.2%) earned over $70,000 compared to 17.2% nationally. The employment status of those at least 15 was that 906 (50.7%) people were employed full-time, 264 (14.8%) were part-time, and 63 (3.5%) were unemployed.

Education

See also
List of streets in Hamilton
Suburbs of Hamilton, New Zealand

References

Suburbs of Hamilton, New Zealand
Populated places on the Waikato River